Awedony  (Arabic : عودوني )  also often  Awedoony is a 1998 album by Amr Diab that contains his international hit "Awedony" of the same name.

Track listing
(Arabic language song titles in brackets)
Awedony (عودوني)			
Kalast Feek Kol Alkalam (خلصت فيك كل الكلام)			
Al Malak el Barea (الملاك البريء)			
Enta Yali Bahebak (انت يلي بحبك)			
Nary (ناري)			
Laially El Omr (ليالي العمر)			
Weghalawtac (وغلاوتك)			
Melk Edeak (ملك ايدك)

References

1998 albums
Amr Diab albums